KGGA (88.1 FM) is a radio station licensed to serve Gallup, New Mexico, United States. The station is owned by the Board of Education of the City of Albuquerque, New Mexico.

References

External links
 

GGA
Radio stations established in 2008
2008 establishments in New Mexico